Juan Aguilera Herrera (born 22 March 1962) is a retired Spanish professional male tennis player. He was born in Barcelona, Spain.

Aguilera has won five singles titles during his career, including one Grand Prix Championship Series title and one Tennis Masters shield, the Hamburg Masters in 1984 and 1990, defeating Boris Becker in the final of the latter in straight sets. His career-high singles ranking was world No. 7, achieved in September 1984.

Career finals

Singles (5 titles, 4 runner-ups)

References

External links
 
 
 

1962 births
Living people
Spanish male tennis players
Tennis players from Catalonia
Tennis players from Barcelona
20th-century Spanish people